Lakshminarayana Vaidyanathan (9 April 1942 – 19 May 2007) was an acclaimed musicologist, music director and composer, trained in the classical Carnatic music tradition. Vaidyanathan was born in Chennai to V. Lakshminarayana, and Seethalakshmi, both accomplished musicians. He was the elder brother of accomplished violinist duo L. Shankar and L. Subramaniam. He created the tunes of the iconic TV serial Malgudi Days. All three brothers received their musical training from their father.

Career
Vaidyanathan started his career as an Assistant music director to G. K. Venkatesh and composed the score for over 170 films in languages including Tamil and Kannada. His notable works include Pesum Padam, Ezhavathu Manithan, Dasaratham and Marupakkam in Tamil and Aparichita, Kubi Matthu Iyala, Ondu Mutthina Kathe in Kannada. He was one of the best music arrangers in the country and was known for his use of rare and unknown instruments, subtly mixing sounds from the mandolin, flute and violin with various folk percussion instruments before the advent of present-day technological advances in sound mixing. He collaborated with C.Ashwath and composed music for many Kannada movies in the name Ashwath-Vaidi.
One catchy and enduring composition of his would be, the Opening and Closing Score 'Thaana na nana' of Shankar Nag's Malgudi Days (TV series).

In 2003, the government of Tamil Nadu awarded Vaidyanathan with the Kalaimamani for contributions to cinema.

Filmography
With C. Aswath

As solo composer
Aparichita (1978)
Ezhavathu Manithan (1982)
Lottery Ticket (1982)
Anubhava (1984)
Ondu Muttina Kathe (1987)    
Pushpaka Vimana (1987)
Sandhya Raagam (1989)
Love Maadi Nodu (1989)
En Kadhal Kanmani (1990)
Marupakkam (1991) 
Venal Kinavukal (1991)
Kubi Matthu Iyala (1992)
Dasarathan (1993)
Hrudayanjali (2002)
Oruththi (2003)

References

2007 deaths
Musicians from Tamil Nadu
Tamil film score composers
Kannada film score composers
Carnatic composers
1942 births
Tamil musicians
20th-century Indian musicians
Recipients of the Kalaimamani Award